Orthogonius monolophus is a species of ground beetle in the subfamily Orthogoniinae. It was described by Andrewes in 1931.

References

monolophus
Beetles described in 1931